Coenraet Roepel (1678, The Hague – 1748, The Hague), was an 18th-century fruit and flower still life painter from the Northern Netherlands.

Biography
	
According to Jan van Gool he was an avid gardener and his love of flowers made him become a pupil of Constantijn Netscher so that he could paint the flowers and other plants in his garden. He travelled to Düsseldorf in 1716 and received a gold chain and medal from Johann Wilhelm, Elector Palatine for his work. He had high hopes of painting more for the elector, but his patron died the same year, so Coenraet returned to the Netherlands. On his return, he became a member of the Confrerie Pictura in 1718 and was very successful in The Hague, receiving as much as 1,000 guilders for a work, but was later eclipsed by the flower painter Jan van Huysum.	
	
According to the RKD he was trained in the Confrerie in the years 1698-1699 and first became a member there in 1711. His pupil was Pieter Terwesten.	
	
The Lazaro Galdiano Museum in Madrid owns a couple of Still lifes, one with fruits and the other a Vase with Flowers, from Roepel.

References
	
Coenraet Roepel on Artnet	

1678 births
1748 deaths
18th-century Dutch painters
18th-century Dutch male artists
Dutch male painters
Artists from The Hague
Painters from The Hague
Flower artists